Raja Haji Fisabilillah International Airport , formerly Kijang Airport, is an international airport located in Tanjungpinang, Riau Islands, Indonesia. It is the second largest airport in Riau Islands, after the Hang Nadim International Airport in Batam.

History
The airport is named after Raja Haji Fisabilillah (1727–1784), the sultan of Johor-Riau Sultanate and national hero of Indonesia. In the beginning, it was managed by the State Assets Directorate General of Civil Aviation Ministry of Transportation. In 2000, the operation of Kijang Airport was transferred to PT Angkasa Pura II.

On April 12, 2008, Kijang Airport's name was officially changed to Raja Haji Fisabilillah International Airport in a ceremony conducted by the Minister of Transportation of the Republic of Indonesia Jusman Syafii Djamal in the presence of Riau Islands Governor Ismeth Abdullah, Vice Governor of Riau Islands HM Sani, Chairman of the Parliament H.M. Nur Syafriadi and other local officials.  new passenger terminal with a size of 8,300 m2 and one telescopic gangway was inaugurated in June 2013. It has a capacity of 1000,000 passengers per year, 10 times larger than the old terminal.

The airport was formerly served from Malacca in Malaysia by Sky Aviation. This was stopped in mid-2013 when Sky Aviation ceased operations. After that, the airport has not had any regular international destinations. On 17 December 2016, Citilink began charter flights from Tanjung Pinang to Wuhan, reinitiating international flights from the airport.

Airlines and destinations

Statistics

References

External links
 Raja Haji Fisabilillah International Airport - Indonesia Airport Global Website
 Airport page at PT. Angkasa Pura II
 

Tanjungpinang
Airports in the Riau Islands